Alyaksey Tarabanaw (born 3 May 1984) is a retired Belarusian professional footballer.

External links
Profile at teams.by

1984 births
Living people
Sportspeople from Grodno
Belarusian footballers
Association football midfielders
FC Dynamo Brest players
FC Slavia Mozyr players
FC Dnepr Mogilev players
FC Belcard Grodno players